Plectorrhiza brevilabris, commonly known as the small tangle orchid, is an epiphytic or lithophytic orchid endemic to Australia. It has many coarse, wiry roots, between three and nine bright green leaves and up to twenty green, star-shaped flowers with reddish brown markings and a white patch on the labellum. It grows in rainforest on trees, shrubs and occasionally on rocks and occurs on the near coastal ranges of eastern Queensland.

Description
The sepals and petals are free from each other and spread widely apart. Flowering occurs from November to February.

Taxonomy and naming
The small tangle orchid was first formally described in 1880 by Ferdinand von Mueller who gave it the name Cleisostoma brevilabre and published the description in Fragmenta phytographiae Australiae. In 1967 Alick Dockrill changed the name to Plectorrhiza brevilabris. The specific epithet (brevilabris) is derived from the Latin words brevis meaning "short" and labrum meaning "lip".

Distribution and habitat
Plectorrhiza brevilabris grows in rainforest on small trees, shrubs and the thinner branches of larger trees. It is found in the McIlwraith Range and in near coastal ranges and tableland south to the Noosa River.

References

Aeridinae
Epiphytic orchids
Endemic orchids of Australia
Orchids of Queensland
Plants described in 1880
Taxa named by Ferdinand von Mueller